MacGregor or Macgregor may refer to:

People
 MacGregor (surname)
 MacGregor (filmmaker), a Spanish commercial cinematographer and film director
 Clan Gregor, a Scottish clan
 Macgregor baronets, related individuals including a British Army Brigadier General

Places
 Macgregor, Australian Capital Territory, Australia
 MacGregor, Queensland, Australia
 MacGregor, Manitoba, Canada
 MacGregor Airport
 MacGregor Point Provincial Park, Ontario, Canada

Other uses
 MacGregor Golf, a manufacturer of golf equipment, accessories and apparel
 MacGregor International AB, a Finnish company that makes cargo-handling machinery
 MacGregor Yacht Corporation

See also

 McGregor (disambiguation)
 Gregor (disambiguation)